K. K. Senthil Kumar is an Indian cinematographer who works in Telugu cinema. He is known for his frequent collaborations with S.S. Rajamouli. He graduated with a degree in cinematography from the Film and Television Institute of India, Pune. He made his debut as a cinematographer with the sitcom TV series Amrutham. He made his film debut with Aithe (2003) which brought him recognition. 

He went on to work in notable films like Sye (2004), Chatrapathi (2005), Yamadonga (2007), Arundhati (2009), Magadheera (2009), Eega (2012), Baahubali: The Beginning (2015), Baahubali 2: The Conclusion (2017), and RRR (2022). He has received two Nandi Awards by the Andhra Pradesh government and three Filmfare Awards South among other accolades.

Early and personal life
K. K. Senthil Kumar was born and brought up in Hyderabad, into a Tamil-speaking family. He is the eldest of three siblings. He graduated with a degree in cinematography from the Film and Television Institute of India (FTII), Pune. He married Ruhee on 25 June 2009, who is a Yoga instructor and heads the Hyderabad division of Bharat Thakur’s Yoga classes.

Career 
After his graduation from FTII, he joined cinematographer Sarath as an assistant. He worked with Sarath from Premaku Velayara (1999) till Jabili (2001). He worked for 13 episodes in Amrutham. When Chandra Sekhar Yeleti directed Aithe (2003), he took Senthil on as the cinematographer.

Filmography

Awards
South Indian International Movie Awards
SIIMA Award for Best Cinematographer (Telugu)-  Eega (2012) at 1st SIIMA
SIIMA Award for Best Cinematographer (Telugu) -  Baahubali: The Beginning (2015) at 5th SIIMA
SIIMA Award for Best Cinematographer (Telugu) -  Baahubali 2: The Conclusion (2017) at 7th SIIMA
Filmfare Awards South
Best Cinematographer- Magadheera (2010) at 57th Filmfare Awards South
Best Cinematographer- Baahubali: The Beginning (2015) at 63rd Filmfare Awards South
Best Cinematographer- Baahubali 2: The Conclusion (2017) at 65th Filmfare Awards South

CineMAA Awards
CineMAA Award for Best Cinematographer – Magadheera (2010)
CineMAA Award for Best Cinematographer – Yamadonga (2008)
Nandi Awards
Best Cinematographer - Eega (2012) at Nandi Awards of 2012
Best Cinematographer - Baahubali: The Beginning (2015) at Nandi Awards of 2015
Santosham Film Awards
 Best Cinematographer - Baahubali 2: The Conclusion (2017) at 16th Santosham Film Awards

References

Living people
Malayalam film cinematographers
Telugu film cinematographers
Filmfare Awards South winners
Film directors from Hyderabad, India
1964 births
Film and Television Institute of India alumni
People from Secunderabad
Cinematographers from Telangana